David Hindmarch (born October 15, 1958) is a Canadian former National Hockey League player for the Calgary Flames. Hindmarch represented Canada at the 1980 Winter Olympics held in Lake Placid, where he scored three goals and four assists in six games.

Son of UBC Thunderbirds sporting legend and athletic director Bob Hindmarch, Dave played with the University of Alberta Golden Bears hockey team, winning a national championship and leading the nation in scoring goals.

He played 99 NHL games for the Flames and scored 21 goals and 17 assists. He scored his first NHL goal in his first game. A persistent ankle injury led him to retire.

References

External links

1958 births
Living people
Alberta Golden Bears ice hockey players
Atlanta Flames draft picks
Calgary Flames players
Canadian ice hockey forwards
Ice hockey people from Vancouver
Ice hockey players at the 1980 Winter Olympics
Olympic ice hockey players of Canada